Kastriot Hysi (born 26 February 1958) is an Albanian footballer. He played in seven matches for the Albania national football team from 1980 to 1981.

References

External links
 

1958 births
Living people
Albanian footballers
Albania international footballers
Place of birth missing (living people)
Association footballers not categorized by position